Lany Kaligis (born 22 April 1949), sometimes known as Lany Lumanauw, is a former Indonesian professional tennis player. She played at Grand Slam events between 1968 and 1975, in women's singles, women's doubles and mixed doubles.

In women's doubles, she and partner Lita Liem Sugiarto reached two Grand Slam quarterfinals: the Australian Open in 1970 and Wimbledon in 1971. As such, she and Liem were among the first Indonesians to reach the later rounds of a Grand Slam competition. In singles, her best results were her third round exits from the Australian Championships in 1968 and the Australian Open in 1970.

She enjoyed some success at the Asian Games. At the 1966 Asian Games at Bangkok, she won the gold medal in the women's singles, the gold medal in the women's doubles with Lita Liem, the bronze medal in the mixed doubles with Soen Houw Goto. She also won the bronze medal in the women's singles at the 1974 Asian Games in Tehran.

Kaligis was also a regular representative of Indonesia in the Fed Cup, playing in 1969, 1970, 1973, 1974 and 1975.

ITF finals

Singles (4–2)

Doubles (11–5)

Grand Slam performance timelines

Singles

Doubles 

Kaligis's partner at all Grand Slam events was Lita Liem Sugiarto, except at Wimbledon in 1974, where she was partnered by Penny Moor of Great Britain.

External links
 
 
 

Indonesian female tennis players
1949 births
Living people
Asian Games medalists in tennis
Tennis players at the 1966 Asian Games
Tennis players at the 1974 Asian Games
Asian Games gold medalists for Indonesia
Asian Games bronze medalists for Indonesia
Medalists at the 1966 Asian Games
Medalists at the 1974 Asian Games
Minahasa people
Southeast Asian Games gold medalists for Indonesia
Southeast Asian Games silver medalists for Indonesia
Southeast Asian Games bronze medalists for Indonesia
Southeast Asian Games medalists in tennis
Competitors at the 1977 Southeast Asian Games